Harry Rutherford (19031985) was a British painter who is regarded as one of the most important painters of the "Northern School", a group led by L. S. Lowry which depicted the post-industrial changes around North West England. He was the first visual artist to present a television programme, and later became President of the Manchester Academy of Fine Arts.

Background 
He was born at Market Street, Denton, Manchester, the youngest of four sons of hat trimmer William Rutherford and his wife Mary Swindells.

He left school at 14, but while still there attended the Hyde School of Art and continued his studies at the Manchester School of Art under Pierre Adolphe Valette; L. S. Lowry was among his fellow pupils. In 1925, Rutherford was the first and youngest pupil to enrol in Walter Sickert's new school of art in Manchester. His association with Sickert was lifelong, and Sickert referred to Rutherford as "my intellectual heir and successor."

Career
In 1931, Rutherford moved to London. The new medium of television provided opportunities for him to exploit his ability to sketch rapidly. In 193639 and in 1946, Rutherford presented the BBC Television light entertainment programme Cabaret Cartoons, in which he drew variety artists as they performed their acts. In 195056, he starred in his own programme, Sketchbook.

While exhibiting in numerous London galleries, he was invited to hold a series of exhibitions in Borneo in 1957, becoming the first western artist to do so.

He returned to Hyde in the late 1950s to 17 Nelson Street and was elected President of the Manchester Academy of Fine Arts. In his later years, he taught at the Regional College of Art in Manchester, where his pupils included the painter Geoffrey Key.

Collections
Rutherford's work is in several public art collections including: The Royal Academy, Manchester Art Gallery, The Atkinson Gallery, Gallery Oldham and Rochdale Art Gallery.

The Rutherford Gallery
In 2008 Tameside Metropolitan Borough Council opened an exhibition space in Hyde Library to display permanently the town's collection of Rutherford works.  The Rutherford Gallery, celebrates the life of the artist.

There are two Blue Plaques for Rutherford in Hyde. One is on his former home 17 Nelson Street, keeping a studio next door and there is one on Hyde Town Hall.

Notes

References

Bibliography
 The Northern School: A Reappraisal, Martin Regan, 2016 978-1527203204
 Centre Stage, The Art of Harry Rutherford, Stephen Whittle, Tameside Museums, 2013

External links
 
 
 Harry Rutherford's work at Gateway Gallery

British artists
1903 births
1985 deaths